Craig Pilling (born 14 September 1986) is a British freestyle wrestler. He competed for Wales in the men’s freestyle 55kg event at the 2010 Commonwealth Games placing 4th. Four years later, he competed in the men's freestyle 57 kg event at the 2014 Commonwealth Games where he won a bronze medal.

References

External links

1986 births
Living people
Commonwealth Games bronze medallists for Wales
Wrestlers at the 2014 Commonwealth Games
Sportspeople from Bolton
British male sport wrestlers
Commonwealth Games medallists in wrestling
Medallists at the 2014 Commonwealth Games